Bab-e Kahnuj may refer to:
 Bab-e Kahnuj, Bardsir
 Bab-e Kahnuj, Jiroft